Lounge On The Farm was a music festival held annually at Merton Farm, Canterbury, Kent, which attracted thousands of visitors each year. Organisers presented it as ‘non-conformist’ and promoted bands and produce from Kent. The event was held in the nine years from 2006 to 2015, before being ‘shelved’. , it has yet to return.

2006
The first Lounge On The Farm festival, took place during the weekend of 15–16 July 2006 with a DJ tent, acoustic tent, and main stage, (later the Cow Shed). Around 80 acts performed.

They included:-

Vincent Vincent and the Villains
The Egg
Nizlopi
The View
Kitty Daisy & Lewis
The Buff Medways
Syd Arthur

2007

The festival was held over three days with more acts than the first event. There was an  acoustic tent, DJ tent renamed the Hoedown, main stage renamed Arabesque, Sheep Dip, Further Tent and Festival Folly stage.

Acts included:-

Super Furry Animals
Alabama 3
Dub Pistols
The Bees
 Wild Billy Childish & The Musicians of the British Empire
The Noisettes
Terry Hall
Kitty Daisy & Lewis
Sonny J
Syd Arthur

2008
There were seven stages over three days and 150 acts performed, attracting a record 4,000 attendance.

Acts included:-

The New York Dolls
Mystery Jets
Art Brut
The Coral
Lightspeed Champion
The Bees
Black Kids
Holy Fuck
Los Campesinos!
Sonny J
Those Dancing Days
Natty
Johnny Foreigner
The Draytones
The Shortwave Set
Kevin Rowland
DJ Format
Terry Hall
Midfield General

2009
Took place over the 10–12 July weekend with an extra Rockaoke, and Meadow with open-air theatre and petting zoo.

Acts included:-

The XX
Roots Manuva
The Horrors 
Edwyn Collins
The King Blues
Dan le sac vs Scroobius Pip
Gong
Golden Silvers
Portico Quartet
Mr. Scruff
Casiokids
Syd Arthur
The Temper Trap
S.C.U.M
Kid Harpoon
Toddla T
Los Salvadores
Krafty Kuts
James Taylor Quartet
DJ Food
Wild Beasts

2010

Over three days.

Acts included:-

Toro Y Moi
Courtney Pine
Bad Manners
The Crazy World of Arthur Brown
Example
Hercules and Love Affair
Jah Wobble
Toots & the Maytals
Martha and the Vandellas
Tunng
DJ Yoda
Beardyman
Phill Jupitus 
Hot Club de Paris
Kitty Daisy & Lewis
Los Salvadores
Syd Arthur

2011

There were 10,000 visitors and a new Main Stage, the Cow Shed becoming the Dance Arena.

Acts included:-

The Streets
Ellie Goulding
Echo & the Bunnymen
Example
Katy B
Annie Mac
Netsky (musician)
Danny Byrd
London Elektricity
Everything Everything
Johnny Flynn
The Vaccines
Devlin (rapper) 
Scratch Perverts
Benjamin Francis Leftwich
Dananananaykroyd
Syd Arthur
Phil Kay
Holly Walsh
Slow Club
Nu:Tone
Graham Coxon
Caravan (band)

2012
Over the weekend of 7-8 July 2012 with restricted sale of youth tickets.

Acts included:-

Emeli Sandé
Example
The Wombats
The Charlatans (UK band)
Dexys Midnight Runners
Chic (band)
Fake Blood
Goldie
Hervé (DJ)
Toddla T
Karima Francis
Kitty, Daisy & Lewis
Netsky (musician)
Slow Club
Spector (UK band)
Mystery Jets
Scratch Perverts
Caspa

Footnotes

External links
LOTF website
WeLoveFestivals - Lounge on The Farm 2010

Music festivals in Kent
City of Canterbury